King George V School (KGV) was a government high school for boys in the Gilbert Islands (now Kiribati), within the British colony Gilbert and Ellice Islands. Throughout its history it was in multiple locations in South Tarawa and Abemama. It served as a boarding school, and trained people to be government workers and teachers.

John Garrett, author of Where Nets Were Cast: Christianity in Oceania Since World War II, wrote that many of its alumni "shaped a nucleus which assisted" the independence of what became Kiribati.

History
It was originally located in Bairiki, South Tarawa, where it opened in 1922. For much of its history its headmaster was a New Zealander, F. G. L. Holland. At some point it moved to Abemama.

It moved to Bikenibeu, South Tarawa in 1953. From 1953 until 1975 students from the Ellice Islands could sit the selection tests for admission to the King George V School (and the Elaine Bernacchi Secondary School). In 1974, the Ellice Islanders voted for separate British dependency status as Tuvalu, which ended the Gilbert and Ellice Islands colony. The following year the Tuvaluan students were transferred to Motufoua Secondary School on Vaitupu. 

In 1965 KGV merged with the girls' school Elaine Bernacchi School (EBS) to form the coeducational King George V and Elaine Bernacchi School.

Enrollment
It had 150 students in 1955.

Notable staff
 Taomati Iuta - Teacher, later Kiribati Speaker of Parliament

References

High schools in Kiribati
Boarding schools
Educational institutions established in 1922
1922 establishments in the Gilbert and Ellice Islands
Educational institutions disestablished in 1965
1965 disestablishments in the British Empire